"No Questions Asked" is a rock song performed by British-American music group Fleetwood Mac, and written by Stevie Nicks. Nicks wrote the song in a hotel room without a tape recorder, but her friend Kelly Johnston provided one for her. Nicks claims the song would never have been written if Johnston had not been there.

"Paper Doll", another song penned by Nicks, was originally slated to appear on the Greatest Hits compilation, but the band pulled it in favor of "No Questions Asked".

Personnel
Fleetwood Mac
Stevie Nicks – lead vocals
Rick Vito – lead guitar, backing vocals
Billy Burnette – guitar, backing vocals
Christine McVie – keyboards, backing vocals
John McVie – bass guitar
Mick Fleetwood – drums
Additional Personnel
Dan Garfield – keyboard programming

Charts

References

The Great Rock Discography. Martin C.Strong. Page 378. 

Fleetwood Mac songs
1988 singles
Songs written by Stevie Nicks
1988 songs
Warner Records singles